White-Out Conditions is the first album by the Norwegian band Bel Canto.

Track listing
"Blank Sheets" – 4:15
"Dreaming Girl" – 3:05
"Without You"  – 4:04
"Capio" – 2:23
"Agassiz" – 3:53
"Kloeberdanz" – 3:02
"White-Out Conditions" – 4:10
"Baltic Ice-Breaker" – 4:45
"Upland" – 7:02
"Chaideinoi" – 3:29

Single
"Blank Sheets" – 3:40
"Chaideino" - 3:25

Musicians

 Anneli Drecker - vocals, synthesizer
 Nils Johansen - mandolin, flute, bass, synthesizer, programming
 Geir Jenssen - synthesizer, programming

Also credited:

 Marc Hollander - woodwinds

References 

1987 debut albums
Bel Canto (band) albums
Nettwerk Records albums
Crammed Discs albums